Artem Yuriyovych Danylyuk (born 6 July 2001) is a Ukrainian professional footballer who plays as a left-back on loan for Bukovyna Chernivtsi.

Career
Born in Rivne, Danylyuk is a product of the local Veres Rivne youth sportive school and the UFK-Karpaty Lviv youth sportive school system.

He played for FC Karpaty in the Ukrainian Premier League Reserves, but never made his debut for the main-squad team in the Ukrainian First League.  In September 2020 he signed a deal with his home team Veres Rivne, that played in this time in the Ukrainian First League, where he made his debut as a second-half substitute in the home winning match against FC Polissya Zhytomyr on 20 March 2021.

References

External links
 
 

2001 births
Living people
Sportspeople from Rivne
Ukrainian footballers
Association football defenders
Ukraine youth international footballers
FC Karpaty Lviv players
NK Veres Rivne players
FC Bukovyna Chernivtsi players
Ukrainian First League players